Merouane Dahar (born December 25, 1992 in Sousse, Tunisia) is an Algerian footballer. He currently plays as a forward for MC Oran in the Algerian Ligue Professionnelle 1.

Club career
Merouane Dahar started playing with ES Sahel. On January 13, 2016, he signed a contract with MC Oran, joining them on a transfer from ES Sétif.

Honours

National titles
 Won the Tunisian Cup once with ES Sahel in 2012
 Won the Algerian Ligue 1 once with ES Sétif in 2015
 Won the Algerian Super Cup once with ES Sétif in 2015

International titles
 Won the CAF Super Cup once with ES Sétif in 2015

References

External links
 Player profile - footballdatabase.eu

1992 births
Living people
People from Sousse
Algerian footballers
Algerian Ligue Professionnelle 1 players
Étoile Sportive du Sahel players
CR Belouizdad players
ES Sétif players
MC Oran players
Expatriate footballers in Tunisia
Algerian expatriate sportspeople in Tunisia
Algerian expatriate footballers
Association football forwards
21st-century Algerian people